Viktoriya Kutuzova (born 19 August 1988) is a former tennis player from Ukraine.
On 28 November 2005, she reached her career-high singles ranking of world No. 76.

Career
Even though considered a potential superstar on tour, Kutuzova remained most notable for her results as a 14-year-old. In her debut WTA Tour main-draw event, the Tier-II tournament in Los Angeles 2003, Kutuzova beat top-50 player Lina Krasnoroutskaya in the first round, and top-30 player Alexandra Stevenson in her next match, before losing in the third round to the then-world No. 12, Ai Sugiyama.

Other career highlights in WTA Tour events included a fourth-round appearance at the Tier-I event at Indian Wells 2005, eventually losing to then-No. 1 Lindsay Davenport. Kutuzova also made the second round at three of the four Grand Slam events on the tour.

As a junior, she reached the final of the Australian Open in 2003 losing to Barbora Záhlavová-Strýcová.

Kutuzova experienced considerable success on the ITF Circuit. She won four French ITF events. In 2008, Kutuzova won her biggest ITF title in Cagnes-sur-Mer. Her other titles came in Poitiers (2005) and Deauville (2005 and 2006). In 2009, she reached the final of the $100k event in Torhout, losing to Karolina Šprem, in straight sets.

Kutuzova suffered shoulder problems throughout her young career which stalled her progression on the main tour.

After having over a year off-tour, Kutuzova used her protected ranking to enter her first big event, the 2011 Sparta Prague Open, where she lost to Katarzyna Piter in round one. She also entered Roland Garros using her protected ranking, but was beaten by Chanelle Scheepers in the first round.

ITF Circuit finals

Singles (6–2)

Doubles (0–1)

Performance timeline

Singles

External links

 
 
 
 Official website

1988 births
Ukrainian female tennis players
Living people
Sportspeople from Odesa
21st-century Ukrainian women